The Charroi de Nîmes (English: "Cartage (or Convoy of Merchandise) of Nîmes"), is an Old French chanson de geste from the first half of the twelfth-century, part of the cycle of chansons concerning Guillaume (or William) of Orange, generally referred to collectively as the Geste de Guillaume d'Orange.

The poem exists in 8 manuscripts which all include other chansons from the same cycle.  The poem comprises 1,486 decasyllable verses in 57 assonanced laisses; there is no shorter syllable lines (found in some of the other chansons concerning William).  63% of the lines are in direct discourse, which give this chanson a distinctly spoken character.

The first modern edition was printed in 1857-1867 in Vol. 1 of the collected chansons about William of Orange published in The Hague by the Dutch scholar Jonkbloet.

Plot
The story is as follows: on returning home from a hunt, William learns that King Louis (Charlemagne's son) has forgotten him in the distribution of fiefs.  William reminds the king of his past service (as told in the chanson Li coronemenz Looïs), and he is eventually accorded the right to an expeditionary force to conquer Nîmes from the Saracens. Disguising himself as a merchant leading a convoy of carts, and hiding his troops in barrels on the carts, William is able to come into the city and seize it (echoing the ruse of the Trojan Horse).

Historical sources
The story is not based on a historical event.

Notes

References
 Geneviève Hasenohr and Michel Zink, eds.  Dictionnaire des lettres françaises: Le Moyen Age.  Collection: La Pochothèque.  Paris: Fayard, 1992. 
 J.-L. Perrier, ed. Le Charroi de Nimes: Chanson de geste du XIIe siècle. Paris: Honoré Champion, 1982.
 Urban T. Holmes Jr.  A History of Old French Literature from the Origins to 1300.  New York: F.S. Crofts, 1938.

French poems
Epic poems in French
Chansons de geste
12th-century books